The Best Halloween Ever! is a children's book by Barbara Robinson. The book is a sequel to Robinson's earlier work The Best Christmas Pageant Ever.

Reception
Matt Berman of Common Sense Media describes the book as being "tame to the point of being lame", while Chris Sherman of Booklist says that "Robinson's suspenseful romp will delight fans of previous books".

References

American children's novels
HarperCollins books
2004 American novels
Halloween novels
2004 children's books